Kachimayu or Kachi Mayu (Quechua for "salt river", hispanicized spellings Cachimayo, Cachimayu, Cachi Mayu) may refer to:

Rivers
 Kachimayu (Ayacucho-Huancavelica) in the Ayacucho and Huancavelica Regions, Peru
 Kachimayu (Cusco) in the Cusco Region, Peru
 Kachimayu (Huancavelica) in the Huancavelica Region, Peru
 Kachimayu, one of the headwaters of the river Willkamayu in the Ayacucho Region, Peru
 Kachi Mayu (Oruro) in the Oruro Department, Bolivia 
 Kachi Mayu (Chuquisaca) in the Chuquisaca Department, Bolivia

Places 
 Cachimayo District and its seat Cachimayo in the Cusco Region, Peru